Sony Music Philippines, Inc. is a record label based in the Philippines, which was founded in 1995 as an imprint of the international music label Sony Music Entertainment and a part of its Asia-Pacific chain. After the closure of the local label caused by widespread piracy problems in the Philippines in 2012, it resumed its operations in 2018.

History
In 1995, after OctoArts International (now PolyEast Records) signed a distribution deal with EMI, Sony Music Philippines was established with its first office at the Shaw Boulevard in Mandaluyong. In 2005, as an after-effect of the Sony BMG merger (which happened a year earlier), it merged with Bertelsmann's local label BMG Records (Pilipinas) Inc. (itself founded in the early 1990s) to become Sony BMG Music Entertainment Philippines. A few months later, its offices were transferred from the Equitable Bank Building in Cubao, Quezon City to the Taipan Place in Ortigas, Pasig for even lower taxes and better work amenities. In 2009, the label was renamed Sony Music Entertainment Philippines, and also began partnering with GMA Records for releases of some artists like Aljur Abrenica and La Diva.

Ivory Music and Video (formerly Ivory Records) handled distribution for Sony Music's catalog in the Philippines in July 2011, and in February 2012, the label closed its office at the Taipan Place in Ortigas, Pasig after a long battle with widespread piracy. This was the first time since the early 1990s (under OctoArts) that international Sony Music releases were licensed by an independent Philippine label. The distribution contract expired in late 2017.

Sony Music Philippines started to re-open in 2018 (and since then it became fully independent since early 2011), and in July 2019, the label held a press event in Pasig marking its formal re-launching, announcing the new roster of artists signed to them which includes Ben&Ben, The Vowels They Orbit, Alex Bruce, Syd Hartha, and the band Nathan & Mercury.

In late 2019, Filipino boy band SB19 signed a recording contract with the label. In March 2022, Filipina girl group 4th Impact also signed a recording contract.

In 2020, artists from Balcony Entertainment, including its founder Rico Blanco and actress/singer Maris Racal, signed an agreement with Sony Music Philippines to distribute single/album releases from the Balcony roster.

In 2021, SME launched Waterwalk Records, a sublabel focused on Contemporary Christian music featuring artists like Morissette.

Artists

Current
 Rivermaya (1994–2001; since 2022)
 6cyclemind (2003–2012; since 2022) (Soupstar Entertainment; distribution only)
 Itchyworms (2008–2012; since 2020)
 Sponge Cola (since 2020)
 Rico Blanco (since 2020)
 Ben&Ben (since 2019)
 The Vowels They Orbit (Soupstar Entertainment; distribution only)
 Alex Bruce
 Syd Hartha
 of Mercury (f/k/a Nathan & Mercury)
 Oh, Flamingo!
 Timothy Run
 Mona Gonzales
 Ace Banzuelo
 SB19 (since 2019)
 Henyong Makata 
 We Got (Soupstar Entertainment; distribution only)
 Bea Lorenzo
 Abaddon
 Nobody's Home 
 Kunnns
 Plan-B
 Michael Bars
 Ren
 Cris Cyrus Gondra
 Lili (Lily Gonzales)
 Nobita
 Young One (Dongalo Wreckords)
 Lady Mazta
 Pablo
 Munimuni
 KAIA
 4th Impact (since 2022)
 ABY
 Baet Alcantara
 Bianca Lipana
 Flict G
 Jarlo Base (Dane Hipolito)
 Any Name's Okay
 Loir
 YARA

OFFMUTE (sublabel)
 Clara Benin
 Young Cocoa

Waterwalk Records (sublabel)
 Morissette (Underdog Music PH / Stages Productions)
 Hazel Faith
 EJ De Perio
 Janine Danielle 
 Sam&Steff

Associated/affiliated labels
Balcony Entertainment
 Suzara (Bolichie and Top Suzara)
 Raven Aviso
 Maris Racal

Yellow Room Music (independent label owned by Monty Macalino)
 647
 Sharlene San Pedro
 Kuatro Kantos

Former
Musiko Records/BMG Records (Pilipinas)
Eraserheads (1989–2002; catalog now handled by Sony Music Philippines and Offshore Music)
Smokey Mountain (1991–1995)
Ariel Rivera (1991–2009)
Bodjie's Law of Gravity
Michael Laygo
Labuyo
Grace Nono (1992–1999)
Lea Salonga (1993–2012)
Francis Magalona (1994–2007; died in 2009)
J Brothers (1996–2005)
The Company (1996–2000)
Angelika Dela Cruz (1996–2000)
Novia (1997–1999)
Anna Fegi (1997–2005)
Madz (1998–2010)
Yano
Bing Rodrigo
Color It Red
Barako Boys
Boysvoyz
Calvin Millado
Mike Luis
Times Two
Willie Nepomuceno
Agot Isidro (1999)
Dingdong Avanzado (Infiniti Music; distribution only from 1999–2001)
Sunshine Cruz (Infiniti Music; distribution only from 1999–2001)
Bigtime
Jo Awayan 
Cornelia Luna
Ilonah Jean
Chad Borja 
Michael Terry
Nelson Del Castillo
Mar Silverio
Paul Toledo
SexBomb Girls (2001–2011)
Sharon Cuneta (2001–2005 (BMG) and 2005–2012 (Sony BMG); now under Star Music)
Lito Camo
Louie Ocampo
Ciudad
Hajji Alejandro 
Edgie and The Jackalites
Lou Bonnevie
Jun Lopito
Sugar Hiccup
Ang Tunay Na Amo
Odette Quesada
Luke Mejares (2003–2011)
Father & Sons
Ciara Sotto
Jimmy Bondoc (2003–2011)
Cris Villonco
Agaw Agimat
Cecile Fernando
Fatal Posporos
Kaya
Jao Mapa
Fourmula

Sony Music Entertainment Philippines (first incarnation)
South Border (1996–2005; now independent)
Razorback (1997–2004; now under Hebigat Sounds Inc.) 
Hungry Young Poets
Ghetto Doggs (1999–2000; now defunct) 
G. Toengi
Sandwich (1999–2003; now under PolyEast Records)
The Dawn (2000–2004; now under Solstice Ventures Inc.)
Kapatid (2003–2006)
DaPulis
Mae Rivera
Champagne Morales
Jenine Desiderio 
Andrew E.
Mayonnaise (2003–2007; now under Yellow Room and Ivory Music and Video)
Kjwan (2004–2006)

Sony BMG Music Entertainment Philippines/Sony Music Entertainment Philippines (second incarnation)
Brownman Revival (2005–2010)
Cueshé (2005–2011; now under Big Dipper Entertainment)
Gloc-9 (2005–2012; now under Universal Records)
Pupil (2005–2012; now under UMG Philippines)
Callalily (2006–2011; now under Callalily Entertainment/Sindikato Inc./O/C Records/Viva Records)
Gian Magdangal (2006–2010)
Lovi Poe (2006–2010; now under ABS-CBN) 
Mau Marcelo (2006–2009)
Moonstar88 (2007–2012; now under Soupstar Music) 
Zelle (2007–2012)
Sugarpop (2007–2009)
KC Concepcion (2008–2012; now under Cornerstone Entertainment)
Gretchen Espina (2008–2010; quit showbiz)
Moymoy Palaboy (2008–2011)
Joanna Ampil (2008–2011)
Letter Day Story (2009–2012)
La Diva (2009–2010)
Rachel Alejandro (2009–2011; now under Star Music)
Aljur Abrenica (2010–2011)
Eevee (2010–2012; now under Ivory Music & Video)
Kiss Jane (2010–2012) 
Cesar Montano (2010–2012)
Mark Alain (2011–2012)
Stephanie Dan (2011–2012) 
Sheng Belmonte (2011–2012) 
The Opera Belles (2011–2012)
Kaligta (2011–2012)

See also
 PolyEast Records
 Star Music
 UMG Philippines
 Universal Records (Philippines)
 Ivory Music and Video

References

External links
 Sony Music Philippines Website
  
  
 
 

Sony Music
Companies established in 1995
Record labels established in 1995
Record labels disestablished in 2012
Record labels established in 2018
Companies based in Pasig
Philippine record labels